László Domonkos (10 October 1886 – 25 September 1956) was a Hungarian footballer. He competed in the men's tournament at the 1912 Summer Olympics.

References

External links
 

1886 births
1956 deaths
Hungarian footballers
Hungary international footballers
Olympic footballers of Hungary
Footballers at the 1912 Summer Olympics
Footballers from Budapest
Association football goalkeepers
MTK Budapest FC players